Orla Chennaoui (born 13 November 1979) is a Northern Irish television journalist and former all-Ireland triple jump champion.  Chennaoui was born in Draperstown, County Londonderry in Northern Ireland. After completing a degree in Law and French at Queen's University Belfast, she moved to Edinburgh to take a postgraduate diploma in journalism at Napier University.  While in Edinburgh Chennaoui began her journalism career, working in print-journalism at Scotland on Sunday and the Edinburgh Evening News.  

Chennaoui moved into broadcast journalism at 2 Ten FM, a local radio station in Reading, Berkshire. A move into regional television news followed, working on the Meridian West news service at ITV Meridian and the ITV News network, based in Southampton. She returned to Scotland with a role at STV and Scotland Today.

In 2005, she joined Sky News as Northern Ireland correspondent. In 2010 Chennaoui made a move into sports broadcasting for Sky Sports specialising in cycling; she was also Sky Sports' principal correspondent for the 2012 and 2016 Olympic Games.

In 2019, Chennaoui left Sky to join Eurosport as the lead presenter for the station's coverage of cycling events.

Personal
She is married to Moroccan-born Mourad Chennaoui; they have two children and live in London and Amsterdam.

References

People from County Londonderry
Tour de France journalists
Female athletes from Northern Ireland
British sports journalists
Sports journalists from Northern Ireland
Alumni of Queen's University Belfast
Sky Sports presenters and reporters
Living people
1979 births